Marcia Annia Claudia Alcia Athenais Gavidia Latiaria, otherwise most commonly known as Athenais (143-161) was a Roman noblewoman of Greek Athenian and Italian Roman descent who lived in the Roman Empire.

Ancestry and Family
Athenais was born to a distinguished and very rich family of consular rank. She was the second daughter and among the children of the Greek Athenian Roman Senator, Sophist Herodes Atticus and the Roman highly aristocratic, influential noblewoman Aspasia Annia Regilla.
 
The paternal grandparents of Athenais were the Roman Senator Tiberius Claudius Atticus Herodes and the wealthy heiress Vibullia Alcia Agrippina, while her maternal grandparents were the Roman Senator, Consul Appius Annius Trebonius Gallus and the aristocratic woman Atilia Caucidia Tertulla. Her paternal uncle was Tiberius Claudius Atticus Herodianus, while her paternal aunt was Claudia Tisamenis. The maternal uncle of Athenais was Appius Annius Atilius Bradua who served as an ordinary consul in 160.

Through her maternal grandfather, Athenais was a relative to the Roman Empress Faustina the Elder, wife of the Roman Emperor Antoninus Pius. Faustina the Elder was the mother of Roman Empress Faustina the Younger and aunt of Roman Emperor Marcus Aurelius. Thus she was a relative to the family of Faustina the Younger and Marcus Aurelius.

Life
Athenais was born in the year of her father's consulship in Rome. She was probably born in the villa that was owned by her parents on the Appian Way. After her father's consulship, Athenais and her family left Italy and moved to Greece, where they became a part of the highest Greek circle of society, particularly in Athens. Athenais was directly cut off from her immediate family and relatives in Italy.

The parents of Athenais erected a great outdoor nymphaeum (a monumental fountain) at Olympia, Greece. The monumental fountain features statues and honors members of the ruling imperial family, including members of her family and relatives of her parents. Among the statues was a bust of Athenais which is on display at the Archaeological Museum of Olympia.

The parents of Athenais had betrothed her to an Athenian aristocrat called Lucius Vibullius Rufus. Lucius Vibullius Rufus and Athenais were paternal second cousins. Lucius Vibullius Rufus was previously married and had at least one son called Lucius Vibullius. Lucius Vibullius was adopted by Herodes Atticus as his son sometime after 160 and was known as Lucius Vibullius Claudius Herodes.

In 160 Athenais married Lucius Vibullius Rufus. In 161, Athenais bore a son called Lucius Vibullius Hipparchus. Shortly after the birth of their son, Athenais died.

References

Sources
 Σ. Θ. Φωτείνου, Ολυμπία - Οδηγός Αρχαιοτήτων, Συγκρότημα Γραφικών Τεχνών, Άνω Καλαμάκι Αθήνα, 1972
 Graindor, P., Un milliardaire antique, Ayers Company Publishers, 1979
 Burn, A.R., The Penguin History of Greece, Penguin Books, 1990
 Wilson, N.G., Encyclopedia of Ancient Greece, Routledge, 2006
 Pomeroy, S.B., The murder of Regilla: a case of domestic violence in antiquity, Harvard University Press, 2007
 :it:Aspasia Annia Regilla
 http://www.vroma.org/~bmcmanus/women_civicdonors.html
 :de:Appius Annius Atilius Bradua

External links

143 births
161 deaths
2nd-century Greek women
2nd-century Romans
2nd-century Athenians
2nd-century Roman women
Annii
Claudii
Marcii
Roman-era Athenians
Deaths in childbirth